The Euskotren 900 series is an electric multiple unit (EMU) train type operated by Euskotren in the Basque Country, Spain.

History
In January 2009, Euskotren awarded CAF the construction of 27 3-car EMUs for 129 million euros, excluding VAT. The contract was later extended to 30 4-car EMUs for 201 million euros.

The first trainset was delivered on 16 March 2011 in Durango. Five days later, on March 21, it made its first test trip on the Topo line. The series entered service on that same line (Euskotren's busiest) on July 22.

The series gradually replaced the older 200 and 3500 series trains, with the last unit being delivered in 2014.

Interior
Each train has 214 seats, with additional space for 186 standing passengers.
Internally, the four cars are connected with open gangways. Ten of the trains (those used on longer routes) are equipped with toilets.

Wheelchair spaces are provided at one end of the two intermediate cars, the doors near them are equipped with ramps. All trains have dedicated spaces for passengers carrying bicycles.

Naming
The units are named after towns and villages in which Euskotren operates.

See also
 Euskotren rolling stock
 Euskotren 950 series – the three-car counterpart of the 900 series

References

External links
 

Electric multiple units of Spain
900 series
CAF multiple units
Train-related introductions in 2011
1500 V DC multiple units